The Albertville City Schools or Albertville City School System is the public school district of Albertville, Alabama. Albertville City School System serves 5,842 students and employs 302 teachers and 155 staff as of the 2020-2021 school year. The district includes three elementary schools, two middle schools, and one high school.

Schools 
The Albertville City School System consists of six schools:

 Albertville Kindergarten and Pre-K (PK-K)
 Albertville Primary School (1-2)
 Albertville Elementary School (3-4)
 Albertville Intermediate School (5-6)
 Albertville Middle School (7-8)
 Albertville High School (9-12)

References

External links 
 Albertville City School System website

School districts in Alabama
Education in Etowah County, Alabama
Education in Marshall County, Alabama
Huntsville-Decatur, AL Combined Statistical Area